is a recurring fictional character in Nintendo's Mario franchise, created by Shigeru Miyamoto and introduced in the 1985 original Super Mario Bros. installment. She is the princess regnant and ruler of the Mushroom Kingdom, where she resides in her castle along with Toads.

Being the lead female character in the series, Peach's role is often the damsel in distress or donor who can help Mario. She is typically a playable character in multiplayer games of the series, including main games such as Super Mario 3D World and spin-off media. In Princess Toadstool's Castle Run and Super Princess Peach, she is the protagonist and player character.

She is one of the best known female protagonists in video game history, with the most video game appearances of any female character.

Development

Peach's initial appearance was drawn by Shigeru Miyamoto. Miyamoto later asked Yōichi Kotabe to redraw Peach with his instructions. He had asked Kotabe to draw her eyes to be "a little cat-like" and how she should "look stubborn, but a little cute."

In Japan, Peach's name has always been  since her debut in the original Super Mario Bros. in 1985, but she was localized as "Princess Toadstool" in the English-language manual. The English version of Yoshi's Safari, released in 1993, contained the first usage of the name "Peach" in the Western world, though she was called Princess Toadstool in Wario Land: Super Mario Land 3, released in 1994. In Super Mario 64, released in 1996, she uses both names in a letter addressed to Mario, signing it "Peach". From the 1996 game Mario Kart 64 onward, the name Peach is used in Western versions.

Overview
Peach is the native resident princess of the Mushroom Kingdom. Within her castle are royal guards known as Toads (formerly known as "mushroom retainers"). Peach's first appearance is in Super Mario Bros. (1985) as a NPC (known as "Princess Toadstool" at the time), in which she was captured by Bowser and Mario had to rescue her. However, the game suggests that Peach is not helpless as she is the only person capable of breaking the curse hanging over the Mushroom Kingdom. In Super Mario Bros. 2, she became a playable character, uniquely able to hover.

Mostly playable, her roles vary between damsel in distress and protagonist, like in Super Mario Run. She is at the center of her own story with Princess Toadstool's Castle Run (1990). Her most prominent role is in Super Princess Peach (2005) on the Nintendo DS, where she must save Mario, Luigi, and Toads from Bowser. She is not a playable character in New Super Mario Bros. Wii because a satisfactory mechanism to use her dress was not found. She is a playable character in Super Mario 3D World and Super Paper Mario, is the main protagonist in Super Princess Peach, and is a playable character in most Mario spin-offs such as Mario Party, Mario Kart, Mario Tennis, and Mario Golf.

In Super Mario RPG and Paper Mario, a cabinet minister or chancellor is part of the Mushroom Kingdom government.  Her father, the Mushroom King, though mentioned in the instruction manual to Super Mario Bros., has never made an appearance in the mainstream games.

In other media
In the cartoon series by DiC, she is always referred to as Princess Toadstool, because the name Peach had not been used in the Western world until Yoshi's Safari in 1993, and she had red hair instead of yellow. Unlike in video games, she is occasionally seen using power-ups such as the Tanooki Leaf. She is voiced by Jeannie Elias in The Super Mario Bros. Super Show! and Tracey Moore in the two follow up series, The Adventures of Super Mario Bros. 3 and Super Mario World.

Shogakukan published between 1992 and 1994 a manga named Otenba Pīchi-hime, with a plot revolving around a younger version of the princess. From February 2006 to March 2007, the magazine Famitsu DS+Wii published a comical manga based on the Super Princess Peach called Peach no Daiboken!? created by Kazumi Sugiyama.

Princess Peach is also prominently featured within Universal Studios Japan and Universal Studios Hollywood's immersive Super Nintendo World areas. A costume character meet-and-greet with her is located next to a large scale recreation of her castle, with the interior referencing its appearance from Super Mario 64. Peach and Baby Peach appear in the Mario Kart: Bowser's Challenge and Yoshi's Adventure attractions. The interactive "Power-Up Bands" feature a design based on her dress.

Peach will be voiced by Anya Taylor-Joy in the upcoming 2023 film adaptation. Her casting, alongside the rest of the principal cast, was announced via a Nintendo Direct in September 2021. In an October 2021 interview, Anya expressed her eagerness for taking on the role: "Oh, it is so much fun. [...] The greatest part is that I get to say I am doing homework or work or research just by gaming. [...] The fan base is so intense, of course, I have to do it."

Cameos

Peach has made cameo appearances in non-Mario games. She is a playable guest character in the GameCube versions of the Electronic Arts games NBA Street V3 and SSX on Tour. She is depicted in a painting in Hyrule Castle in The Legend of Zelda: Ocarina of Time. A drivable Peach kart toy is in the Labrador and Friends version of Nintendogs. In The Legend of Zelda: Link's Awakening, her picture is sent to Mr. Write with the name "Christine" written underneath. In Kirby Super Star, she appears at the King Dedede battle arena, and in the minigame Megaton Punch. In Kirby Super Star Ultra, she is at the Dedede arena. Her crown is collectible in Pikmin 2, labeled "Unspeakable Wonder". In Donkey Kong Country 2: Diddy's Kong Quest, Cranky Kong indirectly references her in some of his Monkey Museum ramblings.

Reception

Players
In a reader poll on the Japanese website of Super Smash Bros., Peach was ranked as the 2nd most requested character for Super Smash Bros. Melee with 66 votes. A reader poll in Official Nintendo Magazine rated her as the second greatest female character; the magazine stated that "some might view her as being a bit useless but we'll let her off as rescuing her is always so much fun". In 2011, readers of Guinness World Records Gamer's Edition voted her the 44th video game character of all time. In a Redex website poll in 2020, she was voted as the 2nd most popular character from the Mario Kart series. Actress Brie Larson said "I'm just excited about the idea of pushing for a Princess Peach solo game. I think it's just been too long. Let's put Peach up there, let's give her her time to shine".

Critics
SyFy included Peach as one of the "Greatest Video Game Heroines of all Time", stating "it's great to have tough female characters like many of the others on this list, but it's great to have one that embraces the power of being a high femme". GameDaily described Princess Peach as an "ideal woman that's as sweet as can be" in its list of "babes that should or shouldn't meet your mom". The website ranked her 48th in its list of Top 50 Hottest Game Babes, claiming that she is "the quiet 'quick, come and rescue me' type, but in Mario Strikers Charged she's all action with a hot sports outfit and shows the boys who's boss". IGN editor Matt Casamassina stated that "Nintendo prudes will probably find themselves taken aback with Peach's outfit, which shows more of the character than we've ever seen before". IGN rated her as 8 out of 10 princesses worth saving. The New York Times said she had "grit as well as grace" and that her "peachiness did nothing to upset the apple cart of expectation: she may have been athletic, smart and strong, but she was also adorable [and what] once-unisex, postfeminist parents are shooting for". Gaming Debugged listed Peach 1st place in their top "10 Video Game Princesses", calling her "The Duchess of princesses" and indicating "She might seem prim and proper in pink, but she's definitely the top princess in our kingdom". Manolith listed her among "25 Hottest Female Videogame Protagonists", citing her Strikers outfit. S. Williams of Momzone magazine declared her "gaming's lone female role model", citing her humility and gutsy charm. UGO ranked her ninth on its list of the "Top 11 Girls of Gaming". Electronic Gaming Monthly ranked her 10th among Top Ten Video Game Politicians. Kotaku dedicated the article "Princess Peach Was The Best Character In Super Mario Bros. 2". GameDaily listed her among hottest blondes in video games, citing appearances in sports games such as Super Mario Strikers and SSX on Tour; in the former, she wears a pink crop top, bare midriff, and pink shorts. It listed "damsel in distress" among the top 25 video game archetypes, citing Peach's frequent kidnappings. Polygon ranked her 4th of 73 Super Smash Bros. Ultimate fighters "from garbage to glorious".

Feminist organization Sister Namibia has been critical of the fact that Peach has always needed to be rescued, by reasoning "it propagates that women are helpless and in constant need of saving" and "[she] serves quite literally as a trophy for the completion of Mario's quest. She is ultimately just another object or reward for Mario to use."

Destructoid's Gamer's Red Carpet graded her D, calling her pink dress "awful", as opposed to Princess Daisy with a B+ and Rosalina with an A+. IGN called Peach "all smiles and politeness" but labelled her as one of the weirdest Mario characters due to her constant kidnappings. IGN later stated that "when she's not staring blankly at nothing, she can be rather adorable", however the fact that "Mario can heroically collect 120 Power Stars all while saving Peach's kingdom and still get nothing but a cake in return makes us think this might be something of a one-sided relationship".

She was nominated for "Cyber Vixen of the Year" at the 2006 Spike Video Game Awards.

Legacy
On August 6, 2014, Nintendo declared August as National Peach Month. A parody sculpture of the music video of "Wrecking Ball" by Miley Cyrus including Chain Chomp and Princess Peach has been made by custom figurine artist Kodykoala.

She is considered as an LGBT icon by several journalists. The A.V. Club stated that "she became a perhaps unlikely but nevertheless important queer icon". John Walker of Splinter described Peach as a "queer icon", saying "If you polled a room full of non-straight men about the women they consider to be 'queer icons' you'd probably hear a lot of 'Beyoncé', 'Dolly Parton', and 'Grace Jones'. But there's one name you might not hear that totally deserves a spot on that list: Princess Peach". Gay Times listed Super Princess Peach in its top "9 video games queer people love, from Tomb Raider to Animal Crossing". On March 11, 2010, Brightest Young Things named her "Gay icon of the week", saying that "For many, she was your first girlfriend ... and just pretend you were the hottest, baddest bombshell who could float, dig down 300 feet of desert sand, and beat mice with sunglasses".

The release of Peachette in New Super Mario Bros. U Deluxe led to fan speculation and theories as to how the new Super Crown power-up works within the Super Mario universe. In 2018, a short comic "The Super Crown's some spicy new Mario lore" on DeviantArt and Twitter transforms Bowser into a monstrously sinister female resembling Peach, which fans named Bowsette. The character subsequently went viral, with Ars Technica writing that Bowsette's popularity was partly due to her contrast with Princess Peach.

Notes

References

External links
  on Play Nintendo
 Princess Peach on Mario Wiki

Female characters in video games
Fictional female sportspeople
Mario (franchise) characters
Nintendo protagonists
Princess characters in video games
Super Smash Bros. fighters
Video game characters introduced in 1985
Fictional hostages and kidnapped people
Fictional princesses
Video game characters who use magic